Rybalka (Ay-Balık) is a rural locality (a settlement) in Mayminskoye Rural Settlement of Mayminsky District, the Altai Republic, Russia. The population was 62 as of 2016. There are 7 streets.

Geography 
Rybalka is located on the Katun River, 13 km south of Mayma (the district's administrative centre) by road. Katun is the nearest rural locality.

References 

Rural localities in Mayminsky District